Berény is an old Hungarian male given name of Turkic origin, meaning benefactor or tax collector. It derived from the name of a Kabar tribe, who joined the conquering Hungarians in the 9th century. According to Lajos Kiss it is related to the (plural) Berendey tribe, with its singular form *berendi meaning "surrendered".

References

Hungarian masculine given names